Hillylaid Pool is a water channel running through the Fylde and Wyre areas of Lancashire in England.

Hillylaid Pool joins the River Wyre at Stanah, shortly after merging with another watercourse to the northwest of Flint's Caravan Park.

It has the ability to be pumped at high tide by a pumping station on River Road, beside the entrance to Wyre Estuary Country Park.

It was the subject of Wyre River Trust's Hillylaid Pool Wetland Project in 2018. The wetlands were created on the banks of the Wyre at Stanah in 2020, a combined effort of The Rivers Trust and Wyre Rivers Trust.

Gallery

References

External links
Hillylaid Pool - Tidal Wyre – Catchment Data Explorer, Environment Agency
Land Drainage Strategy - August 2004 – Wyre Council

Rivers of the Borough of Fylde
Rivers of the Borough of Wyre
The Fylde
1Hillylaid